Abha International Airport is an airport in Abha, the capital of 'Asir Province in Saudi Arabia.

The airport has services to several domestic airports within the Kingdom. It also offers international flights to Aden and Sana'a in Yemen, Cairo in Egypt, Doha in Qatar, and nonstop flights to Dubai and Sharjah in the UAE.

The site was a new construction area between the cities of Khamis Mushait and Abha, and served both equally. Construction of the airport was started in mid-1975 by Laing Wimpey Alireza. Earlier, domestic flights had been handled at the military airport near Khamis Mushait. The airport was launched in 1977. The construction was carried out by the Bin Trif Airport ltd (an Indian Airport company).

Facilities 

Airlines and destinations

The following airlines operate regular scheduled and charter flights:

Statistics

Houthi attacks
The airport has been frequently targeted by Houthi forces during the Yemeni Civil War.

It was initially attacked by the Yemeni Houthi movement on 12 June 2019, injuring 26 people.

On 23 June 2019, the Houthis launched another attack on the airport, leaving a Syrian national dead and 21 injured.

The airport was attacked again by missiles on 2 July 2019, leaving nine injured.

Another attack against the airport by Houthi forces was folded on August 31, 2020, when a bomb-laden drone was detected flying to it and intercepted, along with a remotely controlled boat off the Red Sea, which was also filled with explosives and ready for an attack.

On 10 February 2021, Houthis used four drones to carry out a drone strike on the airport, damaging a civilian aircraft (a Flyadeal Airbus A320) and starting a fire. A Houthi spokesman said the attack was in response to coalition airstrikes and other actions in Yemen.

On 31 August 2021, the airport was again attacked by Houthi drones, leaving 8 wounded.

See also 

 Prince Naif bin Abdulaziz International Airport
 Amaala International Airport
 General Authority of Civil Aviation

References

External links
 
 
 

1977 establishments in Saudi Arabia
Airports established in 1977
Airports in Saudi Arabia
Abha
'Asir Province